Gérald Leblanc (September 25, 1945 – May 30, 2005) was an Acadian poet notable for seeking his own Acadian roots and the current voices of Acadian culture.  Leblanc was born in Bouctouche, New Brunswick. He studied at the Université de Moncton and lived in Moncton, where he died in 2005. He also spent a good part of his life in New York City, which he loved.

Deeply Acadian and North American, Gérald Leblanc tirelessly sought the roots of his Acadian identity. The quality and abundance of his poetic work guarantee him a place amongst the most important authors of modern Acadian poetry. He was also the author, along with Claude Beausoleil, of an anthology of Acadian poetry. He was the lyricist for the Acadian musical group 1755 and wrote many of the group's classic songs ("Le monde a bien changé", "Boire ma bouteille", Rue Dufferin", "Kouchibouguac"). He was an unabashed champion of "chiac", which is the slang spoken mainly in south eastern New Brunswick and mixes English and French words and syntax.

As a poet and speaker, he was invited to various countries: Canada (Vancouver, Winnipeg, Toronto, Montreal, Halifax,etc.), the United States (New York and New Orleans), France (Paris, La Rochelle, Caen, Grenoble, Lyon, and Poitiers), Belgium (Brussels, Namur, Liège), the Republic of Congo (Kinshasa), Mexico (Mexico City), the Czech Republic (Prague), Slovakia (Bratislava), and Switzerland (Delémont).

Works

Leblanc's texts (written in French) have been translated into English, Spanish, Italian, Chinese, Czech and Slovak.

Letters
Lettres à mon ami américain 1967-2003: édition annotée préparée par Benoit Doyon-Gosselin, Sudbury, Éditions Prise de parole, 2018 (postmortem)

Poetry

L’extrême frontière, poèmes 1972-1988, Sudbury, Éditions Prise de parole, 2015 (postmortem)
Éloge du chiac, Moncton, Éditions Perce-Neige, 2015 (postmortem)
Complaintes du continent, Moncton, Éditions Perce-Neige, 2014 (postmortem) 
Poèmes new-yorkais (1992-1998), Moncton, Éditions Perce-Neige, 2006 (postmortem)
Techgnose, Moncton, Éditions Perce-Neige, 2004 
Géomancie, Ottawa, Éditions l’Interligne, 2003 
Le plus clair du temps, Moncton, Éditions Perce-Neige, 2001 
Je n’en connais pas la fin, Moncton, Éditions Perce-Neige, 1999 
Méditations sur le désir, artist's book, with Guy Duguay, Moncton, limited edition, hand printed on paper crafted by and with lithographs by Guy Duguay, 1996  
Éloge du chiac, Moncton, Éditions Perce-Neige, 1995 
Complaintes du continent, Moncton/Trois-Rivières, Éditions Perce-Neige/Écrits des forges, 1993 
De la rue, la mémoire, la musique, with Jean-Paul Daoust, Montreal, Lèvres urbaines n. 24, 1993 
Les matins habitables, Moncton, Éditions Perce-Neige, 1991 
L’extrême frontière, Moncton, Éditions d’Acadie, 1988 
Lieux transitoires, Moncton, Michel Henry Éditeur, 1986 
Précis d’intensité, with Herménégilde Chiasson, Montreal, Lèvres urbaines n. 12, 1985 
Géographie de la nuit rouge, Moncton, Éditions d’Acadie, 1984 
Comme un otage du quotidien, Moncton, Éditions Perce-Neige, 1981

Novels
Moncton Mantra, preface by Herménégilde Chiasson, Sudbury, Éditions Prise de parole, [2012] 2008 (postmortem)
Moncton Mantra, English translation by Jo-Anne Elder, Toronto, Guernica, 2001 
Moncton Mantra, Moncton, Éditions Perce-Neige, 1997

Translation
Amazon Angel, Original Ange amazone by Yolande Villemaire, 1982, English translation by Gérald Leblanc, 1993

Essays
La poésie acadienne, with Claude Beausoleil (selection and introduction), Moncton/Trois-Rivières, Éditions Perce-Neige/Écrits des Forges, 1999 
La poésie acadienne 1948-1988, with Claude Beausoleil (selection and introduction), Trois-Rivières/Paris, Écrits des Forges/Le Castor Astral, 1988

Theatre
Et moi!, text for the Département d’art dramatique of the Université de Moncton, with three other Acadian authors: Gracia Couturier, France Daigle and Herménégilde Chiasson, 1999 
Les sentiers de l’espoir, text for the Théâtre l’Escaouette, 1983 
Sus la job avec Alyre, text for the actor Bernard LeBlanc, 1982

Radio
L’été saison des retours, 30 minute text for the FM Network of Radio-Canada, 1989 
Pascal Poirier, one hour text for the FM Network of Radio-Canada, 1982

Publications
Éloizes (Moncton)
Pleins feux (Moncton)
Le Journal (Moncton)
Vallium (Moncton)
Ven’d’est (Petit Rocher)
Lèvres urbaines (Montréal)
Le Devoir (Montréal)
Estuaire (Montréal)
Le Sabord (Trois-Rivières)
Liberté (Montréal)
Ellipse (Sherbrooke)
Liaison (Ontario)
Parallélogramme (Toronto)
Intervention à haute voix (France)
Cahier bleu (France)
Jungle (France)
Europe (France)
Mensuel 25 (Belgium)
Textual (Mexico)
etc.

Literary Awards
Literary Award from the City of Moncton, for L’extrême frontière, during the City Centennial Celebrations, 1990 
Pascal-Poirier Award, from the New Brunswick government for his complete works, 1993 
Terrasses St-Sulpice Award,  from the Estuaire magazine, for Complaintes du continent, 1994

Documentary about Gérald Leblanc

Living on the Edge, the Poetic Works of Gérald Leblanc also known by its French language title L'extrême frontière, l'oeuvre poétique de Gérald Leblanc) is a 2005 documentary film by Canadian director of Acadian origin Rodrigue Jean. In this documentary, Rodrigue Jean pays tribute to his Acadian roots, focusing on the poetry of Gérald Leblanc.

External links
 Fonds Gérald Leblanc (R11764) at Library and Archives Canada

1947 births
2005 deaths
20th-century Canadian poets
Canadian male poets
Acadian people
Canadian poets in French
People from Bouctouche
Writers from Moncton
20th-century Canadian male writers
20th-century Canadian novelists
Canadian male novelists
Canadian novelists in French